Organino indicates a small organ. In particular it can refer to:

 Portative organ
 A free-reed instrument designed by Filippo Testa in 1700, ancestor of the reed organ